Tenon may refer to:
 one of the two elements of a mortise and tenon joint
 Tenon capsule, a membrane around the eyeball
 Tenon Group, a chartered accountancy company in the United Kingdom
 Tenon Limited, a New Zealand-based publicly traded company producing timber products
 Tenon saw, a type of backsaw
 Jacques-René Tenon (1724–1816), a French surgeon